The Kearny Cross was a military decoration of the United States Army, which was first established in 1862 during the opening year of the American Civil War. The original decoration was known as the Kearny Medal and was adopted as an unofficial medal by the officers of the 1st Division, 3rd Corps, of the Union Army of the Potomac, which had served under Major General Philip Kearny.

The original Kearny Medal was first bestowed on November 29, 1862, and was awarded to any Union officer who had performed acts of extreme bravery and heroism in the face of the enemy. It was created by Black, Starr & Frost in 1863. In 1863, the medal was authorized retroactively to officers who had performed such acts while enlisted soldiers, and had been subsequently commissioned.

On March 13, 1863, a second version of the Kearny Medal was ordered established as a "Cross of Valor" for enlisted personnel. The new medal, known as the Kearny Cross, was awarded to any Union soldier who had displayed meritorious, heroic, of distinguished acts while in the face of an enemy force.

By 1865, both the Kearny Medal and the Kearny Cross were commonly referred to by the single name of the Kearny Cross. Since the decorations were issued by local commanders, the medals remained unofficial awards and were not issued after the close of the Civil War. Nevertheless, the Kearny Cross and Medal are regarded as one of the oldest military decorations of the United States Army, second only to the Badge of Military Merit and the Fidelity Medallion.

Women awarded the cross
General Birney awarded Mrs. Anna Etheridge with this award; a nurse and vivandiere born either on May 3, 1839, or May 3, 1844. Also known as "Gentle Annie", she received the award for her bravery. 

Marie Tepe, (1834-1901) also known as "French Mary", a famous vivandiere of the Civil War, was one of at least three women who served during the battle of Gettysburg, the other well documented example being a currently unidentifiable woman, whose body was found amongst the many Confederate dead after Pickett's Charge. While serving under the 114th Pennsylvania Volunteers, also known as the Collis' Zouaves d'Afrique, she received the award for being wounded in the ankle. She was in 13 battles, and carried a .44 caliber pistol.

Charlotte Elizabeth McKay received the Kearney Cross from the officers of the 17th Maine Volunteer Infantry Regiment, whom she had cared for after the Battle of Chancellorsville.

See also
American Civil War Corps Badges

References

Bibliography

Awards and decorations of the United States Army
Awards established in 1862
1862 establishments in the United States